Jordan Mincy (born October 11, 1986) is an American basketball coach who is the current head coach of the Jacksonville Dolphins men's basketball team.

Playing career
Mincy played college basketball at Kent State under both Jim Christian and Geno Ford, where he was part of two MAC regular season and conference tournament squads, making two trips to the NCAA tournament in 2006 and 2008. Mincy left as the all-time leader in MAC history in games played at 135, and in seventh place on Kent State's all-time assists list.

Coaching career
After playing, Mincy joined the staff at South Carolina as a graduate assistant for one season before returning to his alma mater for a two-year stint as an assistant coach. In 2013, he'd join Charleston's coaching staff for one season, before moving on to an assistant coaching spot at Toledo. In 2014, Mincy would join Mike White's staff at Louisiana Tech, and follow White to Florida in 2015 as an assistant coach.

On March 25, 2021 Mincy was named the 17th head coach in program history at Jacksonville, replacing Tony Jasick.

Personal life
Mincy's brother Jerome played basketball at UAB where his number 40 jersey is retired, and professionally in Puerto Rico while representing the country's national team in three Summer Olympic games.
 His sister Jada played basketball at Ole Miss.

Head coaching record

References

Living people
1986 births
American men's basketball coaches
Jacksonville Dolphins men's basketball coaches
Florida Gators men's basketball coaches
College of Charleston Cougars men's basketball coaches
Louisiana Tech Bulldogs basketball coaches
Kent State Golden Flashes men's basketball coaches
Toledo Rockets men's basketball coaches
South Carolina Gamecocks men's basketball coaches
Kent State Golden Flashes men's basketball players
Basketball players from Tennessee
Basketball coaches from Tennessee